Iberia, by James A. Michener (original title: Iberia: Spanish Travels and Reflections, subtitled Photographs by Robert Vavra), is an illustrated travel book published in April 1968 that details the author's exploration of Spain as it was in the decades leading up to the mid-1960s. In researching the book, Michener visited Spain numerous times over a period of 40 years, also referring to it as his "second home".

Chapters 
 Introduction
 Badajoz
 Toledo
 Cordoba
 Las Marismas
 Sevilla
 Madrid
 Salamanca
 Pamplona
 Barcelona
 The Bulls
 Teruel
 Santiago de Compostela
 Index

Themes 
Michener takes a measured, literary view on such subjects as the Moorish occupation, Islam, Catholicism, Francisco Franco, bullfighting, and other controversial themes.

Michener shows to be very prescient, as in his talk of national cycles of rebirth (p. 837): "And one of these days, (change) will be true even of Russia, and we had better be prepared to admit it ... though (in the United States) we fight against it and blind our eye and conscience to the fact".

References

Books by James A. Michener
American travel books
Books about Spain
1968 non-fiction books
Random House books